Québec City Jean Lesage International Airport, also known as Jean Lesage International Airport (French: Aéroport international Jean-Lesage de Québec, or Aéroport de Québec) , is the primary airport serving Quebec City, Canada. In 2021 it was the 15th-busiest airport in Canada, with 353,203 passengers. More than 10 airlines offer 360 weekly flights to destinations across Canada, the United States, Central America, Mexico, the Caribbean and Europe.

Overview

The airport was established in 1939, a year after the closure of the Aérodrome Saint-Louis. First established as a training facility for air observers, the first flight occurred on September 11, 1941. First known as the Aéroport de l'Ancienne Lorette, then the Aéroport de Sainte-Foy, and later the Aéroport de Québec, it was renamed to Aéroport international Jean-Lesage in 1993, in honour of Jean Lesage, the former Premier of Quebec. The airport is managed and operated by Aéroport de Québec inc., a non-profit and non-share corporation. The current terminal building has a capacity of 1.4 million passengers annually.

Beginning in 2006, with a budget of $65.8 million, Québec/Jean Lesage International Airport underwent a modernization designed to increase the terminal's capacity and substantially enhance the level of passenger service. The modernization included a reconfiguration of the terminal on two levels, a restructuring of the baggage handling area and arrivals area, as well as a reconfiguration and enlargement of the waiting rooms. Fifty-four percent of the financing was provided directly by Aéroport de Québec inc. Completed in June 2008, the new configuration of the airport now enables it to handle 1.4 million passengers a year.

Based on the passenger figures for 2009 and 2010, it became clear that the terminal building would reach its design capacity by 2012. Aéroport de Québec inc. is therefore planning further investments of nearly $300 million to further expand the terminal building. Presently the terminal has 17 gates: 12 contact gates and 5 walk-out aircraft positions. This will increase to 24 gates by 2025.

On July 4, 2011, work began on the second phase of the airport expansion, which lasted until 2017. Partially funded through an Airport Improvement Fee, the terminal building doubled in size, at a cost of $224.8 million. The work included an expansion of the international facilities, construction work on the runways, taxiways and de-icing pads, as well as enhancements to customer service facilities. On September 19, 2013, runway 12/30 was renamed to runway 11/29.

The airport charges an Airport Improvement Fee (AIF) to each passenger, it is amongst the highest in Canada at $35 per passenger.

In 2015 the airport was the 12th-busiest airport by total passengers and in 2014 it was the 14th-busiest by aircraft movements in Canada. On 10 March 2016, Prime Minister Justin Trudeau and President Barack Obama announced the addition of the airport to the list of Canadian airports containing U.S. border preclearance facilities. In 2019, Trudeau and President Donald Trump also announced that the airport would obtain border preclearance. However, as of 2021, preclearance is not available.

On December 11, 2017, the first phase of YQB2018, the expansion project, was completed with the opening of the new international terminal. The new facility features more dedicated baggage carousels serving international flights, new customs area, expanded food court and restaurant areas including Starbucks, Pidz and Nourc, four new gates (34 to 37), improved and larger loading area for cars and buses and a larger capacity baggage area.

The last expansion phase was completed in summer of 2019 with the domestic and international terminals being linked all together.

Also added as part of the most recent expansion are 10 holes in the security fence placed at positions determined jointly by the airport authority and a local plane spotting group. These holes are sized to allow photographers to insert telephoto lenses, and are specifically reserved for their use. In 2019, the American website Digital Photography Review called the airport "the number one spot for aviation photographers".

Facilities

Infrastructure
YQB International Airport receives a wide variety of long-, mid- and short-haul aircraft. The airport has two runways. Runway 24 is YQB's main approach pattern equipped with Area navigation (RNAV), required navigation performance (RNP) and non-directional beacon (NDB) approach. Runway 06 has the same approaches with the addition of an instrument landing system (ILS).

There are seven taxiways, Alpha (connecting the main apron with runway 24), Bravo (connecting the main apron with runway 29), Charlie, Delta (parallel to the 06/24), Echo (connecting the main apron with runway 24), Golf (which links Delta to the threshold of runway 06) and Hotel (between Golf and runway 11/29). The airport aprons can accommodate light to large aircraft (12 aerobridge and 9 remote) simultaneously and is designed to accommodate wide-body jet airliners as large as the Boeing 747-400. YQB doesn't have a Visual Docking Guidance System (VDGS) or Parallax Aircraft Parking Aid (PAPA), all stands are assisted by ground operations using marshalling wands–handheld illuminated beacons.

Ramp 3 is where all the flight schools and private airlines are located. Chrono Aviation, Skyjet/Air Liaison, Orizon Aviation, CFAQ, Strait Air and Avjet/TSAS are the main users of this apron.

Runway and aprons

Airlines and destinations

Passenger

Cargo

Statistics

Statistics prior to 2009 are from Transport Canada. From 2009 on statistics are from Aéroport de Québec (ADQ). Transport Canada's statistics are consistently higher than those of ADQ.

Top domestic destinations

Top United States destinations

Top international destinations

Access
Public transportation to the airport is provided by Réseau de transport de la Capitale route 76 to Via Rail's Sainte-Foy station and route 80 to downtown.

Accidents and incidents
 On 9 September 1949, Canadian Pacific Air Lines Flight 108 on a flight from Montreal to Baie-Comeau with a stopover in Quebec City crash-landed east of Quebec City when a bomb exploded on board shortly after departing from Quebec City Jean Lesage Airport (then known as L'Ancienne-Lorette Airport), killing all 19 passengers and four crew. The incident and trial that followed would be known as the Albert Guay affair.
 On 29 March 1979, Quebecair Flight 255, a Fairchild F-27, crashed after take-off, killing 17 and injuring seven.
 On 23 June 2010, a Beechcraft A100 King Air of Aeropro (C-FGIN) crashed north of the airport just after taking off from runway 30 (now runway 29), killing all seven people on board.
 On 12 October 2017, for the first time in North America, a drone collided with a passenger plane. The drone struck the turboprop passenger plane operated by Skyjet Aviation while it was on approach. The drone was operating above the  flight height restriction and within the  exclusion zone around airports, violating drone operating regulations.

See also
 Québec/Lac Saint-Augustin Water Airport

References

External links

 Aéroport de Québec official website (English)

Buildings and structures in Quebec City
Transport in Quebec City
Certified airports in Capitale-Nationale
Military airbases in Capitale-Nationale
Airports established in 1941
1941 establishments in Quebec
National Airports System